is a retired Japanese Nippon Professional Baseball player. He is the current pitching coach for the Orix Buffaloes.

External links

1972 births
Living people
Baseball people from Saitama (city)
Japanese baseball players
Nippon Professional Baseball pitchers
Nippon Ham Fighters players
Japanese baseball coaches
Nippon Professional Baseball coaches